The 2013–14 Hamburger SV season was the 126th season in the club's football history. In 2013–14, the club played in the Bundesliga, the top tier of German football. It was the club's 51st consecutive season in this league, being the only club to have played every season in the Bundesliga since its introduction in 1963.

Competitions

Overall

Friendlies

Pre-season

Bundesliga

League table

Results summary

Matches

Relegation play-offs
Hamburger SV, who finished 16th, faced Greuther Fürth, the third-placed 2013–14 2. Bundesliga side, for a two-legged play-off. The winner on aggregate score after both matches earned entry into the 2014–15 Bundesliga. Hamburg prevailed, avoiding their possible first relegation.

DFB-Pokal

Squad information

Squad and statistics

Squad, appearances and goals

|}

Goal scorers

All competitions

Bundesliga

DFB-Pokal

Transfers

In

Out

Kits

References

Hamburger SV seasons
Hamburger SV season 2013-14